Liverpool railway station is a heritage-listed railway station located on the Main South line, serving the Sydney suburb of Liverpool in Australia. It is served by Sydney Trains T2 Inner West & Leppington, T3 Bankstown and T5 Cumberland services. It was added to the New South Wales State Heritage Register on 2 April 1999.

History
The town (now suburb) of Liverpool on the Georges River was one of the earliest settlements of the colony of New South Wales. The station opened on 26 September 1856 and was an early terminus of the Main South line. Immediately north of Liverpool station, a former branch line crossed the Georges River and entered the Holsworthy military base. The pylons for the bridge over the river have been reused to provide a pedestrian walkway.

In 1929, the line from Central was electrified. Liverpool remained the terminating point for electric services until the wires were extended to Campbelltown in 1968. It was also a calling point for regional services until the 1990s.

In 1965 one person was killed and three injured when a freight train collided with a stationary electric passenger train at Liverpool station.

In 2000, the station underwent a major easy access upgrade with the provision of passenger lifts to the platforms, a new passenger concourse, toilets and a refurbishment of the heritage building on platform 1.

The Southern Sydney Freight Line passes to the east of the station. It opened in January 2013. Around the same time, a new platform for southbound services was constructed as part of the Rail Clearways Program. Platform 4 opened in January 2014. Previously platform 2 was the main southbound platform with platform 3 used for turnbacks.

Platforms and services

The station has four platforms. Platforms 1 and 4 serve the Inner West & Leppington and Cumberland lines, and platforms 2 and 3 serve as a terminus for Bankstown line trains.

Transport links

Liverpool railway station has a busy bus station opened in 2000 attached to it. Local bus services are operated by Interline, Transdev NSW and Transit Systems Sydney.

Stand A
Arrivals Only

Stand B
T-Way route T80: To Parramatta via T-way

Stand C
802: To Parramatta via Green Valley
803: To Miller
853: To Carnes Hill via Hoxton Park Road
854: To Carnes Hill via Greenway Drive & Hoxton Park Road
855: To Rutleigh Park via Austral & Leppington Station
856: To Bringelly
869: To Ingleburn via Edmondson Park & Prestons

Stand D
851: To Carnes Hill Marketplace via Cowpasture Road
852: To Carnes Hill Marketplace via Greenway Drive & Cowpasture Road
857: To Narellan
865: To Casula via Lurnea Shops
866: To Casula
870: To Campbelltown
871: To Campbelltown via Glenfield
872: To Campbelltown via Macquarie Fields

Stand E
Arrivals Only

Stand F
801: To Badgerys Creek
804: To Parramatta via Hinchinbrook
805: To Cabramatta via Bonnyrigg Heights
806: To Parramatta via Abbotsbury
808: To Fairfield via Abbotsbury
819: To Prairiewood
823: To Warwick Farm
827: To Carnes Hill Marketplace via Bonnyrigg Heights

Stand G
901: To Holsworthy via Wattle Grove
902: To Holsworthy via Moorebank
903: To Chipping Norton
904: To Fairfield
M90: To Burwood
NightRide route N30: Macarthur to City Town Hall
NightRide route N30: City Town Hall to Macarthur
NightRide route N31: To Leppington
NightRide route N50: To City Town Hall
 
It is also a calling point for some Greyhound Australia services to and from Canberra.

Heritage listing 
Liverpool railway station was listed on the New South Wales State Heritage Register on 2 April 1999. Although the station has been substantially altered, several heritage aspects remain, including the platform 1 station building, dating from  1880, the  1879 goods shed and 1880 brick-faced platforms.

Liverpool station building is a good example of a third class station building in the centre of a large scale redevelopment of the site. It indicates the change in technology and approach to railway construction. Liverpool goods shed is a rare brick structure on the State system which is substantially intact with platforms and jib crane. It is located in an historic town and is the last remnant of the early station and yard complex at the site. It is rare as one of the last two surviving brick goods sheds in the State.

References

Attribution

External links

Liverpool Public Transport Map Transport for NSW
Liverpool station details Transport for New South Wales

Easy Access railway stations in Sydney
Railway stations in Sydney
Railway stations in Australia opened in 1856
New South Wales State Heritage Register
Articles incorporating text from the New South Wales State Heritage Register
Liverpool, New South Wales
Main Southern railway line, New South Wales